USS Osprey (MHC-51) is the lead ship of Osprey-class coastal mine hunters, and the fourth U.S. Navy ship of that name.

Stricken from the Navy list on 15 June 2006, sold by U.S. General Services Administration to China, 8 May 2014.

References

 

Ships built in Georgia (U.S. state)
1991 ships
Osprey-class coastal minehunters